This page shows the results of the Diving Competition for men and women at the 1963 Pan American Games, held from April 20 to May 5, 1963 in São Paulo, Brazil. There were two events, for both men and women.

Men's competition

3m Springboard

10m Platform

Women's competition

3m Springboard

10m Platform

Medal table

See also
 Diving at the 1964 Summer Olympics

References
 Sports 123

1963
1963 Pan American Games
1963 in water sports
1963 in diving